Blunt Talk is an American sitcom on the Starz cable network starring Patrick Stewart, created by Jonathan Ames, and executive produced by Seth MacFarlane. The series' first two episodes were released online on August 15, 2015, and premiered on Starz on August 22, 2015. The first season concluded on October 24, 2015.

Starz ordered 20 episodes, which were split into two seasons. The second season premiered on October 2, 2016, and concluded on December 11, 2016. On December 20, 2016, the show was cancelled after two seasons.

Premise
The show follows British newscaster Walter Blunt who moves to Los Angeles with the intention of conquering American nightly cable news. His misguided decisions on and off the air prove that his ultimate ambitions will be difficult to achieve.

Blunt's name was taken from the minor character Sir Walter Blunt in William Shakespeare's Henry IV, Part 1, which was Stewart's first role with the Royal Shakespeare Company.

Cast

Main
 Patrick Stewart as Walter Blunt, Falklands War veteran and former Royal Marines major turned cable journalist.
 Jacki Weaver as Rosalie Winter
 Adrian Scarborough as Harry Chandler, Falklands War veteran and former Royal Marines lance corporal turned Walter's valet
 Dolly Wells as Celia, Walter's producer
 Timm Sharp as Jim Stone
 Mary Holland as Shelly Tinkle (recurring season 1; starring season 2)
 Karan Soni as Martin Bassi (recurring season 1; starring season 2)

Recurring
 Richard Lewis as Dr. Weiss, Walter's psychiatrist
 Golden Brooks as Vivian, Blunt's ex-wife
 Ed Begley, Jr. as Teddy Winter, Rosalie's husband
 Fred Melamed as Dr. Mendelson, Walter's second psychiatrist
 Romany Malco as Bob Gardner, Walter's boss
 Brent Spiner as Phil, a pianist at the bar Walter frequents.
 Lesley Ann Warren as Cornelia
 Erik Griffin as Gershawn
Trace Lysette as Giselle
Swati Kapila

Guest stars
 Elisabeth Shue as Suzanne Mayview
 Jason Schwartzman as Duncan Adler
 Sharon Lawrence as Sophie
 Moby as himself
 Daniel Stewart as Rafe Blunt

Episodes

Season 1 (2015)

Season 2 (2016)

Ratings

Season 1

Season 2

Reception

Critical response

Blunt Talk received generally mixed reviews from critics. Review aggregator Rotten Tomatoes gives the first season of the show a rating of 53%, based on 34 reviews, with an average rating of 6.5/10. The site's consensus states, "Blunt Talk squanders Sir Patrick Stewart's considerable gifts on a show that too often mistakes forced vulgarity for wit." Metacritic gives the show a score of 54 out of 100, based on reviews from 24 critics, indicating "mixed or average reviews".

Dominic Patten of Deadline Hollywood states in his review, "If the new series from creator Jonathan Ames and executive producer Seth MacFarlane was just a mix between another Network-inspired show about journalism and some very consistently bad behavior on the part of Patrick Stewart’s cable news host Walter Blunt, it would be hard to recommend giving such a collection of clichés much of your time. However, Blunt Talk, which debuts August 22 on Starz, is more than that and worth going along for the ride."

TV Columnist Brian Lowry of Variety states in his review, "The premiere starts with a rambunctious energy that temporarily promotes a sense of good will. Stewart’s Walter Blunt goes on a bender, sings rap and picks up a transgender prostitute. When the hooker politely asks if he’s troubled at all by who she is, he replies cheerfully, “No, I’m English.” The adventure ends fantastically badly, at least for Blunt's reputation. But from there, the series—which Ames produced with the seemingly ubiquitous Seth MacFarlane — pretty rapidly disintegrates, relying too heavily on Stewart's madcap antics and an assortment of not particularly distinctive supporting players, including Walter's sycophantic producers, Richard Lewis as his therapist and Romany Malco as the harried network boss."

The Guardians Brian Moylan states in his review, "Blunt Talk is an odd bird. It's sort of like if The Newsroom and Veep had a love child and it was raised by Nanny McPhee in the Royal Shakespeare Company. It takes a close look at cable news and the personalities and celebrity involved, but it's essentially about one man who is trying to change himself and do the right thing, but is incredibly bad at it. A crew as colorfully inept as Selina Meyer's also surrounds him, but they don't have the stinging bile of Veep's crew.

Mike Hale of The New York Times states in his review, "It’s not accurate to say that Patrick Stewart hasn’t done comedy. He was funny playing himself as a poker-faced pervert in an episode of Extras, or dancing with Kelsey Grammer and telling him how sexy he looked in a tux on Frasier. And he’s lent his plummy voice to a raft of animated shows from Family Guy to Robot Chicken. Critics viewed the show as a breakout role for Stewart. Shuffling around an airport men’s room stall with his pants around his ankles, for instance, losing his patience as he tries unsuccessfully to cover the toilet seat, or gravely asking a transgender prostitute whether he can feed at her breasts."

Accolades

For the 73rd Golden Globe Awards, Patrick Stewart was nominated for Best Actor in a Television Series – Musical or Comedy.

References

External links

 
 
 
 

2015 American television series debuts
2016 American television series endings
2010s American sitcoms
2010s American workplace comedy television series
Starz original programming
English-language television shows
Television series by Fuzzy Door Productions
Television shows set in Los Angeles
Television series created by Jonathan Ames
Television series by Media Rights Capital
Television series about journalism
Television series about television